Loyola Beach is an unincorporated community in Kleberg County, Texas, United States. Leo Kaufer Park is located in Loyola Beach, with a fishing pier, boat dock, and playground.

Education
Education is provided by Riviera Independent School District and Ricardo Independent School District.

See also
Kingsville micropolitan area

External links
 

Unincorporated communities in Texas
Unincorporated communities in Kleberg County, Texas
Kingsville, Texas micropolitan area